Leviathan, also called the Leviathan Horde, is a fictional Soviet-based terrorist organization appearing in American comic books published by Marvel Comics.

Publication history
Leviathan first appeared in Secret Warriors #11 and was created by Jonathan Hickman and Stefano Caselli.

Fictional organization history
Little is known of this mysterious organization, save that it was born out of the Communist Bloc in the same way that Hydra was born out of the Axis powers, and that Leviathan brought 100,000 of the Eastern Bloc's finest Cold War agents to the facility known as Cold Storage, where the majority were placed in cryonic suspension until needed. Apparently, the higher ups of Leviathan were involved in a collaborative game with the Hydra leader Baron Strucker, S.H.I.E.L.D. leader Nick Fury, and Hand grandmaster Soji Soma where the meeting was set by Aries. They gathered together alien technology from the Brood and a collection of tanks. Together, these devices could turn a man into a Super Soldier. Leviathan then chose to betray their partners and take the technology for themselves. Hydra and the Hand struck back, stealing the alien power source making it so that the tanks would turn their occupants into monsters.

During the Dark Reign storyline, Leviathan attacks Agarashima, stronghold of Clan Yashida where Silver Samurai is attacked by mysterious, demonic warriors. After a small struggle, he is subdued. The black warrior plunges its claws into his face before determining that he does not have what they're looking for. The largest grabs the Samurai demanding to know where "the box" is. The same warriors then attack the Nemesis shipyards where Gorgon is and introduce themselves as members of Leviathan.

Gorgon fights the soldiers of Leviathan. He easily defeats the squad through use of his sword and petrification. He comments that they should have brought an army. The Leviathan squad leader says that that day will come. He then starts charging only to be knocked back. Trying to get back up, the squad leader says that there are plans within plans and his masters are waking from their long sleep. He uses his claws to puncture Gorgon's face intending to find information for his masters. Gorgon quickly reacts by slicing off his arm before using Godkiller to pin him. He then demands to know what they're after. The squad leader reveals that they have Viper. Killing the Leviathan soldier, Gorgon rushes through Nemesis only for Leviathan to escape with Viper in tow. The ruling council of Hydra (consisting of Baron Strucker, Gorgon, Kraken, and Madame Hydra) discusses Leviathan's attack on Nemesis which cost them two dreadnaughts and half of its personnel. Gorgon concludes that there is a traitor in this room. However, Madame Hydra asserts that the whole attack may have been staged. Nonetheless, Kraken informs everyone that the Psi-agents that had been retrieved from Red Worm have been repurposed to find the traitor. At Leviathan's cold storage facilities called The Long Winter, Leviathan brings in Viper for interrogation. The leader demands to know where "the box" is. When she refuses to comply, they plunge their claws into her face before determining that she doesn't know. They learn that Madame Hydra has it. The Leviathan leader grumbles that this is a delay in their plans. He then declares "Summon the horde... wake the best." And before him are countless lines of containers.

Madame Hydra's transport approaches Leviathan's base Long Winter. The Leviathan commander allows her to land. However, Leviathan wants something valuable in return: the box that Madame Hydra had procured from the Yashidas. Madame Hydra presents the Japanese box to Leviathan leader Magadan, much to the dismay of Viper. However, it is not intended for trade, but a gift. Viper frantically ask how she could betray everything she believes in. Madame Hydra responds that she had done this more than more and shoots her. Magadan shows glee at the death of one of Hydra's leaders. Madame Hydra then takes off her headdress to return to her identity as Valentina Allegra de Fontaine. Valentina has gotten back into her old clothing, before detailing to Magadan about Hydra. She explains that while Hydra is technologically advanced, they are struggling with recruitment and divided interests. Magadan's lieutenants then hook up the box and defrost one of the containers awakening its occupant Orion. As Orion clothes himself, Valentina and Magadan update him on the state of Russia. Orion then declares that they she "taunt the Baron, tempt the Fury." Hydra arrives at Long Winter only to find it deserted except for a few squads left behind and the corpse of Viper. One Hydra agent brings to Baron Strucker a holographic recorder which projects an image of Orion (whom Strucker recognizes as Viktor Uvarov). When the device recognizes his voiceprint, Orion's message plays that despite the unfortunate mishaps between their two organizations during his sleep, they should meet at the Crown in three days. Ten days ago, the Leviathan delegation has arrived at the Hydra base called the Crown in Kyoto. Kraken tells Baron Strucker that there are three arriving. Among them is Magadan, Orion, and obviously their traitor. Orion, Magadan, and Valentina Allegra de Fontaine have arrived to meet with the leaders of Hydra. Valentina is more shocked to see Viper alive with tentacles on her head and having regained her status as Madame Hydra. As the meetings begins, Orion gives out an offer of subservience from Hydra. Baron Strucker refuses to and orders Gorgon to kill him. However, Orion survives a stab to the shoulder from Gorgon as Magadan whacks him away with his hammer. It is then that a Leviathan squadron attacks. It is now all-out war between Hydra and Leviathan. Both terrorist organizations have gone extreme in their methods taking out entire bases without regard for civilians. Eventually, the Leviathan thought to make a ceasefire only for Magadan to get assassinated. In retaliation, Leviathan took out a Hydra recruitment center in Seattle.

At the newest Leviathan base Perestroika, Orion and Valentina plot to assault Gorgon and Madame Hydra. Then suddenly, all their Leviathan soldiers begin to self-destruct. They blame is hit on Nick Fury. Valentina later turns herself over to a federal agency in Berlin. Nick Fury visits Valentina in captivity in Berlin. The latter asks him what he has done. He says one thing "I won." Simply put, when Magadan plugged in the Legacy tech from that box she gave Leviathan he was unaware of the fact that Fury controlled the system, feeding the Leviathan warriors more energy than necessary and essentially shortening their lifespans causing them to self-destruct. The only one left is Orion who has a thousand lifetimes to burn out, but he's just one man. Valentina then laments that everything she has worked for has been for nothing. She then admits that she turned herself in so he could find her.

Members
 Vasili Dassaiev / Magadan - The leader of Leviathan. He was assassinated by John Garrett to make it look like that Hydra was responsible.
 Valentina Allegra de Fontaine - She was revealed to have been a mole in S.H.I.E.L.D. and Hydra.
 Viktor Uvarov / Orion - A mercenary of Leviathan. He was later killed by Phil Coulson.

In other media
 Leviathan appears in the live-action Agent Carter television series. The group was founded following World War I on the order of Joseph Stalin, its members including the hypnotist Johann Fennhoff and Dorothy "Dottie" Underwood. As seen in season one, some operatives like Leet Brannis (portrayed by James Frain) and Sasha Demidov (portrayed by James Herbert) have their vocal cords disabled which left with a Y-shaped incision on their neck where the vocal cords are located and preventing them from speaking without the use of a Voice Synthesizer. The group instigates season one's main plot by orchestrating a heist on the vault of Howard Stark's most dangerous inventions. Though Leviathan's intention was to get the violence-inducing "Midnight Oil" gas, Brannis decides to sell Stark's other inventions on the black market rather than return to base. This forces Leviathan to put more operatives into the field to retrieve the gas while eliminating any witnesses, making the group's existence known to the Strategic Scientific Reserve. They first send Demidov to go after Brannis which leads to both of them ending up dead. By season one's end, Fennhoff is arrested by the S.S.R. while Dottie manages to get away. In season two's opening, Dottie and some operatives raid a bank to target the Council of Nine's bank account only for them to be defeated by the S.S.R. When Jack Thompson works on trying to Dottie to inform more about Leviathan, the interrogation is interrupted when Vernon Masters transfers Dottie into FBI custody.

 Leviathan appears as the main antagonist in Avengers Confidential: Black Widow & Punisher. The organization has an auction of stolen technology with various supervillains as buyers (including but not limited to Count Nefaria, Graviton, Grim Reaper, and Baron Heinrich Zemo).

References

External links
 Leviathan at Marvel Wiki

Fictional organizations
Fictional organizations in Marvel Comics
Comic book terrorist organizations
Marvel Comics supervillain teams
Soviet Union in fiction